Kleist, or von Kleist, is a surname.

von Kleist:
August von Kleist (1818–1890), Prussian Major General
Conrad von Kleist (1839-1900), German politician (German Conservative Party), member of Reichstag
Ewald Georg von Kleist (ca. 1700–1748), also known as Ewald Jürgen von Kleist, co-inventor of the Leyden jar
Frederick William von Kleist  (1724–1767),  Prussian major general, commander of the Green Hussars.  One of 58 officers of the Kleist family to serve in the Seven Years' War
Ewald Christian von Kleist (1715–1759), German poet and soldier
Henning Alexander von Kleist (1677–1747) Prussian general
Henning Alexander von Kleist (1707–1784). Prussian Lt. General.  Nephew of Henning Alexander von Kleist (above)
Franz Kasimir von Kleist (1738–1808) Prussian General
Franz Alexander von Kleist (1769–1799) Poet
Friedrich Graf Kleist von Nollendorf (1762–1823), Prussian field marshal
Heinrich von Kleist (1777–1811), German writer
Kleist Prize, German literary prize named after Heinrich
Makka Kleist (born 1951), Greenlandic actress
Paul Ludwig Ewald von Kleist (1881–1954), German field marshal
Panzer Group Kleist and Army Group von Kleist, parts of the German First Panzer Army
Ewald von Kleist-Schmenzin (1890–1945), conspirator to assassinate Adolf Hitler
Ewald-Heinrich von Kleist-Schmenzin (1922–2013), conspirator to assassinate Adolf Hitler

Kleist:
Kleist Sykes, former Tanzanian mayor
Henry Kleist, farmer and Socialist state senator from Rantoul, Wisconsin
Kuupik Kleist, First Minister elect of Greenland
Karl Kleist, German psychiatrist

 

Surnames